The Bunuba (also known as Bunaba, Punapa, Punuba) are a group of Indigenous Australians and are one of the traditional owners of the southern West Kimberley, in Western Australia. Many now live in and around the town of Fitzroy Crossing.

Language
Bunuba is one of only two members of the Bunuban language family.

Country 
The northern frontier ran along the Lady Forrest Range. To the west, it reached as far as Mount Broome, and ran along the Richenda River as far as the Granite Range and Mount Percy. Its southeastern boundary lay along the Oscar Range as far as Brooking Springs. It encompassed also the Geikie Gorge and Stony Creek's headwaters in the northeast. The Bunuba were also masters of the eastern part of the Wunaamin Miliwundi Ranges, at least until the Ngarinjin managed to expel them from that territory, sometime before the advent of white settlement.

History of contact
As white penetration and appropriation of their lands advanced, the pastoralists began to press the government to take strong measures against the presence of "blacks" on their property, some of whom they would nonetheless employ during the dry season. A resistance movement eventually emerged, in the mid 1890s, when the Bunuba leader Jandamarra, nicknamed "Pigeon", from a base in Tunnel Creek in the Oscar Ranges, organized guerilla warfare forays against the intruding cattle- and sheepmen. Jandamarra himself had formerly been enlisted by white authorities to hunt down an earlier Bunuba resistance leader Ellemarra. A crackdown under Inspector Lawrence led to killings among, and the "dispersion" of, many communities, some of the victims being also Gooniyandi. Jandamarra was killed in 1897, but sporadic attacks continued on livestock, and massacres of the indigenous population persisted, one being said to have taken place as late as the 1930s.

Modern period
The Bunuba acquired Leopold Downs and Fairfield Downs stations in 1991. In 2012, after the collapse of their Indonesian market, the Bunuba entered into an agreement with the Australian Agricultural Company where AACo would manage the operations and the Bunuba would receive an annual rent and training opportunities and have complete access to their lands.

Alternative names
 Bunaba
 Punamba (Ngarinjin exonym)
 Kunamba (derogatory exonym, formed by kuna. meaning "dung")
 Bunapa, Booneba

Famous Bunuba 
 Jandamarra, who led one of the few organised armed insurrections documented against European settlement in Australia.
 June Oscar, winner of the 2018 National NAIDOC "Person of the Year" award.

Notes

Citations

Sources

Aboriginal peoples of Western Australia